Kubera Kuchela is a 1943 Indian Tamil-language Hindu mythological film directed by R. S. Mani and written by B. S. Ramaiah. The soundtrack was by Kunnakudi Venkatarama Iyer and background music by S. V. Venkat Raman. The film stars P. U. Chinnappa T. R. Rajakumari, D. Balasubramaniam and P. S. Govindan.

Plot

Cast 
 P. U. Chinnappa as Kubera Kuchela and the demon Kuchela
 Papanasam Sivan as Kuchela
 P. S. Govindan as Krishna
 D. Balasubramaniam as Kubera, the Lord of Wealth
 T. R. Rajakumari as Mallika
 R. Balasubramaniam
 N. S. Krishnan
 T. A. Mathuram
 T. S. Durairaj
 S. R. Janaki
 Pulimootai Ramaswami
 L. Narayana Rao
 T. V. Annapoorani
 M. K. Meenalochani
 P. G. Kuppuswami
 E. Krishnan

Soundtrack 
Music composed by Kunnakudi Venkatarama Iyer and S. V. Venkatraman composed background music. The lyrics were written by Papanasam Sivan and Udumalai Narayana Kavi. The song "Nadaiyalangaram Kanden" is set in the raga Kharaharapriya, "Maalai Chooda Vandhen Mallika" is set in Khamas, "Ennai Vittu Engey Sentreer" is in "Harikambothi", and "Kanna Kanna Kanna" is in "Kapi".

Marketing 
The film was publicised with an innovative poster: a horizontal strip which contained lines in English: "Who Is Rich? Kubera or Kuchela? Watch The Movie".

References 

1940s Tamil-language films
1943 films
1943 musical films
Films about Hinduism
Films based on the Mahabharata
Hindu devotional films
Hindu mythological films
Indian black-and-white films
Indian films based on actual events
Indian musical films
Jupiter Pictures films
Krishna in popular culture
Films scored by Kunnakudi Venkatarama Iyer